Lordiphosa andalusiaca is a species of fly in the family Drosophilidae. It is found in the Palearctic.

References

Drosophilidae
Insects described in 1906
Muscomorph flies of Europe